Amanoyama Shizuo (born Shizuo Ogata; December 28, 1953 – September 17, 1997) was a sumo wrestler from Taku Saga, Japan. He was an amateur champion at Komazawa University and so was given makushita tsukedashi status upon entering professional sumo. He made his professional debut in March 1976, fighting under surname of Ogata,  and reached the top division in March 1978. In his top division debut he defeated ozeki Takanohana and scored 11 wins against 4 losses, winning the Fighting Spirit prize for the only time. He made his makuuchi debut in the same tournament as Kotowaka and as both were unusually tall, they were nicknamed "Jumbo Jet" and "Concorde". His highest rank was maegashira 1. Upon retirement from active competition, he became an elder in the Japan Sumo Association under the name Tatsutayama. He died while an active oyakata in September 1997 at the age of 43. He had been suffering from diabetes and liver disease since his days as an active wrestler.

Career record

See also
Glossary of sumo terms
List of past sumo wrestlers

References

1953 births
Japanese sumo wrestlers
Sumo people from Saga Prefecture
Komazawa University alumni
1997 deaths